John Patrick Glenn is an American screenwriter, producer, and director.

Glenn launched his screenwriting career in 1999, when he sold his spec script Red World to Jerry Bruckheimer and Walt Disney Pictures in a multi-studio bidding war.  Since, he has scripted original films for every major studio, handled production rewrites, produced and directed film, and created Television at myriad of major networks. He formerly served as the showrunner and executive Producer of the CBS drama SEAL Team.

Television career 
Glenn sold his first television show, Black Star, in 2001 to UPN. He has continued to create, write, produce, and direct dozens of projects throughout the last 20 years. Most notably he has created and produced Identity (ABC Studios), The Hatfields and McCoys (NBC/ABC Studios), Tin Man (NBC and Universal Television Studios), Allegiance (NBC and Universal Television Studios), Miranda's Rights (NBC and Universal Television Studios), and SEAL Team (as showrunner, CBS Studios and CBS Network). Over the course of his extensive career, Glenn has developed, sold, and produced over three dozen projects to every major network, including ABC, NBC, CBS, and Fox.  Prior to taking over SEAL Team, Glenn's production company, John Glenn Entertainment, was based at NBC/Universal on the Universal studio lot. During Glenn's successful 4-year tenure with NBC/Universal, he sold and produced multiple projects, and served as Executive Producer on the NBC drama, Allegiance.  Glenn moved his company to CBS in September 2017.

Film career 
Glenn has scripted feature films for every major studio, including  Journey to the Center of the Earth, Clash of the Titans and The Lazarus Project (which Glenn wrote and directed).  In 2008, he delivered a page one rewrite of Eagle Eye that Steven Spielberg attached to direct.  Glenn also worked on re-imaginings for Blade Runner  with producer Bud Yorkin, and for The Warriors with director Tony Scott.
He produced the film Disaster with Roy T. Wood as the director and just recently sold two more films as of 2021.

Glenn has partnered with producers such as Mark Gordon, Peter Chernin, Beau Flynn, Bert Salke, Richard Zanuck, Andrew Lazar, Stephanie Savage, David Janollari, Mary Parent, David Hoberman, Todd Lieberman, Ellen DeGeneres, Mark Burnett, Roma Downy, and Kurtzman-Orci, amongst others. He has worked with notable directors such as Steven Spielberg, M. Night Shyamalan, Paul W. S. Anderson, Tony Scott, DJ Caruso, McG, Justin Lin, F. Gary Gray, and actors Charlize Theron, Sophia Bush, Eva Longoria, Paul Walker, Marcia Gay Harden, Chaz Palminteri, Virginia Madsen, Jason O'Mara, Colin O'Donoghue, David Boreanaz, John Cusack, Angela Bassett, Margot Robbie, John Krasinski, Jake Gyllenhaal, Renée Zellweger, and Demi Moore to name a few.

Personal life

Glenn was born on December 18, 1971, in Tuscaloosa, Alabama and attended the Art Center College of Design in Pasadena, California.  He currently resides outside of Los Angeles in San Marino, California with his wife and three children.

Filmography

Films 

 Red World (1999)
 Journey to the Center of the Earth (2000)
 Clash of the Titans (2002, uncredited)
 Blade Runner v.2 (2003)
 The Warriors (2003)
 The Source (2005)
 Disaster (2006)
 The Lazarus Project (2006)
 Law Abiding Citizen (2008)
 Eagle Eye (2008)
 Junkers (2009)
 Dog Show (2011)
 Abducted (2013)
 Merlin (2017)

Television 

Black Star (2001) - as Creator, Writer, Producer
Payback (2002) - as Creator, Writer, Co-Executive Producer
Deegan's Century (2004) - as Creator, Writer, Co-Executive Producer
Silverlake (2004) - as Creator, Writer, Executive Producer
McCabe (2005-2006) - as Creator, Writer, Executive Producer
Drift (2005-2006) - as Creator, Writer, Executive Producer
Bullet (2006) - as Creator, Writer, Executive Producer 
Mercy (2007) - as Creator, Writer, Executive Producer 
Fix It Men (2008) - as Creator, Writer, Executive Producer 
Fallen (2009) - as Creator, Writer, Executive Producer 
Treadstone (2010) - as Creator, Writer, Executive Producer
Identity (2010-2011) - as Creator, Writer, Executive Producer
Kate Warne (2011) - as Executive Producer 
Treasure Island (2011) - as Creator, Writer, Executive Producer 
Lost Horizon (2012) - as Creator, Writer, Executive Producer
The Hatfields and McCoys (2012-2013) - as Creator, Writer, Executive Producer 
Tin Man (2013-2014) - as Executive Producer 
Conception (2013-2014) - as Creator, Writer, Executive Producer
Ghost Projekt (2013-2014) - as Creator, Writer, Executive Producer
Domino (2013-2014) - as Creator, Writer, Executive Producer 
Allegiance (2014) - as Executive Producer
Justice (2014-2015) - as Executive Producer 
Critical (2014-2015) - as Executive Producer
Last Hour (2014-2015) - as Executive Producer
The Possession of Maggie Gill (2014-2015) - as Creator, Writer, Executive Producer 
Coyote (2015-2016) - as Writer, Executive Producer (with David Goyer)
Caesar (2015-2016) - as Executive Producer 
Miranda's Rights (2015-2016) - as Executive Producer
Heavenly Creatures (2015-2016) - as Creator, Writer, Executive Producer 
Under Suspicion (2016) - as Executive Producer 
Dreamer (2016) - as Executive Producer 
The Evidence Room (2016) - as Creator, Writer, Executive Producer 
Samuri (2017) - as Executive Producer 
My Fair Baby (2017) - as Creator, Executive Producer 
Murder Room (2018) - as Showrunner, Creator, Executive Producer
Trader (2018) - as Showrunner, Creator, Executive Producer 
SEAL Team (2018–19) - as Showrunner / Executive Producer
Cabin Fever (2018-2019) - as Executive Producer 
Viola Wells (2020) - as Showrunner, Creator, Executive Producer

References 

1967 births
Living people
Art Center College of Design
Writers from Tuscaloosa, Alabama
American male screenwriters
American film producers
Film directors from Alabama
Screenwriters from Alabama